William Herrick is the name of:

William Herrick (MP) (1562–1653), English jeweller, courtier, diplomat and politician
William Herrick (novelist) (1915–2004), American novelist
William Herrick (Being Human), a character in the British supernatural drama-comedy television series Being Human